James Herron Hopkins (November 3, 1831June 17, 1904) was a Democratic member of the U.S. House of Representatives representing the Pittsburgh area in Pennsylvania.

Education and career
James H. Hopkins was born in Washington, Pennsylvania.  He attended the common schools and was graduated from Washington College (now Washington and Jefferson College) in Washington in 1850.  He studied law, was admitted to the bar in 1852 and practiced in Pittsburgh, Pennsylvania, for twenty years.  He was also engaged in banking, manufacturing, and mining.  For several years he served as vice president of the Pittsburgh chamber of commerce.

Hopkins was an unsuccessful candidate for election in 1872.  He was elected as a Democrat to the Forty-fourth Congress.  He was an unsuccessful candidate for reelection in 1876.  He was again elected to the Forty-eighth Congress.  He served as the chairman of the United States House Committee on Labor during the Forty-eighth Congress.  He was an unsuccessful candidate for reelection in 1884.

Interstate Commerce
He introduced the first (successful) bill implementing federal regulations on interstate commerce in 1872.  Originally a supporter of such centralized power the oil lobby led by Standard Oil unsuccessfully fought the measure.  Muckraker Ida Tarbell cites Hopkins in many of her works and speeches.

Retirement
After his time in Congress, he engaged in the practice of law in Washington, D.C. He died at his summer home at North Hatley, Quebec, Canada, in 1904. He was buried at Oak Hill Cemetery in Washington, D.C.

References

Sources

The Political Graveyard

1831 births
Washington & Jefferson College alumni
1904 deaths
Pennsylvania lawyers
Democratic Party members of the United States House of Representatives from Pennsylvania
19th-century American politicians
Burials at Oak Hill Cemetery (Washington, D.C.)